Love at Second Sight is a 1934 British romantic comedy film directed by Paul Merzbach and starring Marian Marsh, Anthony Bushell and Claude Hulbert. It was made at Elstree Studios.

The film's sets were designed by the art director David Rawnsley.

Cast
 Marian Marsh as Juliet  
 Anthony Bushell as Bill  
 Claude Hulbert as Allan  
 Ralph Ince as Mackintosh 
 Joan Gardner as Evelyn  
 Stanley Holloway as PC  
 Neil Kenyon as Uncle Angus  
 E. Vivian Reynolds as Butler 
 John Singer as Boy

References

Bibliography
 Low, Rachael. Filmmaking in 1930s Britain. George Allen & Unwin, 1985.
 Wood, Linda. British Films, 1927-1939. British Film Institute, 1986.

External links

1934 films
British romantic comedy films
1934 romantic comedy films
Films shot at British International Pictures Studios
Films directed by Paul Merzbach
Films set in England
British black-and-white films
1930s English-language films
1930s British films